Buddy Collette's Swinging Shepherds is an album by multi-instrumentalist and composer Buddy Collette recorded at sessions in 1958 and released on the EmArcy label. The group features a front line of four flautists.

Reception

The Allmusic site rated the album with 3 stars.

Track listing
All compositions by Buddy Collette except as indicated
 "Pony Tale" (Paul Horn) - 2:28
 "Machito" (Pete Rugolo) - 3:25
 "Short Story" - 3:54
 "Flute Diet" - 4:33
 "Improvisation (With Conga)" (Rugolo, Bud Shank, Collette, Horn, Harry Klee) - 4:45
 "The Funky Shepherds" (Shank) - 4:53
 "Tasty Dish" - 4:23
 "Improvisation (Unaccompanied)" (Rugoo, Shank, Collette, Horn, Klee) - 2:14
 "The Four Winds Blow" (Horn) - 3:37
Recorded at Master Recorders in Hollywood on March 5 (tracks 1-4) and March 7 (tracks 5-9), 1958

Personnel
Buddy Collette, Paul Horn, Harry Klee, Bud Shank - flute, piccolo
Bill Miller - piano
Joe Comfort - bass
Bill Richmond - drums, congas
Pete Rugolo - arranger

References

EmArcy Records albums
Buddy Collette albums
1958 albums